Łęka may refer to:
Łęka, Gmina Łęczyca in Łódź Voivodeship (central Poland)
Łęka, Gmina Piątek in Łódź Voivodeship (central Poland)
Łęka, Lublin Voivodeship (east Poland)
Łęka, Lesser Poland Voivodeship (south Poland)
Łęka, Świętokrzyskie Voivodeship (south-central Poland)
Łęka, Masovian Voivodeship (east-central Poland)
Łęka, Greater Poland Voivodeship (west-central Poland)

See also 
Leka (disambiguation)